Fleet Admiral Feliks Nikolayevich Gromov (29 August 1937 – 22 January 2021) was a Commander-in-Chief of the Russian Navy. Gromov was married and had a daughter and a son.

Gromov was born in Vladivostok and joined the navy in 1955. He completed the S.O. Makarov Pacific Higher Naval School in 1959. He served as an officer on a destroyer and in 1961 served in the strategic missile troops on an exchange programme. He subsequently commanded the cruisers Senyavin and Dmitriy Pozharsky.

In 1977 Gromov became commander of a squadron of surface ships in the Baltic Fleet and was transferred to the Soviet Northern Fleet in 1982. In 1984 he became deputy commander of the Soviet Northern Fleet and was promoted to its commander in 1988.

In 1992 Gromov was given command of the Russian Navy following the dissolution of the Soviet Union. He was promoted to Admiral of the Fleet by Boris Yeltsin in 1996 and retired on 7 November 1997 at age 60, the mandated retirement age for Admirals and Fleet Admirals.

The Jamestown Foundation speculated that Gromov was dismissed because of a Russian Pacific Fleet ammunition explosion which seems to have attracted wide attention. He died in his dacha and was buried at the Federal Military Memorial Cemetery.

References

Sources
https://web.archive.org/web/20061021000536/http://www.jamestown.org/email-to-friend.php?article_id=3219
  Morskoy sbornik, No. 4, April 1992, p. 13.

Russian admirals
Commanders-in-chief of the Russian Navy
Soviet Navy personnel
Soviet admirals
1937 births
2021 deaths
Military personnel from Vladivostok
Recipients of the Order of Military Merit (Russia)
Recipients of the Order "For Service to the Homeland in the Armed Forces of the USSR", 2nd class
N. G. Kuznetsov Naval Academy alumni
Military Academy of the General Staff of the Armed Forces of the Soviet Union alumni
Deaths from the COVID-19 pandemic in Russia
Burials at the Federal Military Memorial Cemetery